PJD can have several meanings

 the custom motorcycle manufacturer Paul Jr. Designs
 the American computer scientist Peter J. Denning
 the Justice and Development Party (Morocco)